Kismet (subtitled A Jazz Interpretation by the Mastersounds) is an album by The Mastersounds led by vibraphonist Buddy Montgomery with pianist Richie Crabtree, bassist Monk Montgomery and drummer Benny Barth along with guitarist Wes Montgomery featuring performances of tunes originally composed by Alexander Borodin and adapted by Robert Wright and George Forrest for the musical Kismet. The album was recorded in 1958 and released on the World Pacific label.

Reception

The Allmusic review by Matthew Greenwald stated: "Overall, an excellent jazz reading of one of the most beloved musicals ever and also an important historical record for Wes Montgomery fans".

Track listing
All compositions by Alexander Borodin, Robert Wright and George Forrest
 "Overture: Not Since Nineveh/Olive Tree/Stranger in Paradise/And This Is My Beloved/Night of Nights/Sands of Time" – 6:47
 "Gesticulate and Rhymes Have I" – 2:56
 "Olive Tree" – 4:58
 "Not Since Nineveh" – 7:20
 "Baubles, Bangles, & Beads" – 3:25
 "Fate" – 5:16
 "And This Is My Beloved" – 6:22
 "Stranger in Paradise" – 4:51

Personnel
Buddy Montgomery – vibraphone
Richie Crabtree – piano
Wes Montgomery – guitar (tracks 1 & 3-8)
Monk Montgomery – Fender electric bass
Benny Barth – drums

References

Buddy Montgomery albums
Monk Montgomery albums
Wes Montgomery albums
1958 albums
World Pacific Records albums